Christ and the Woman Taken in Adultery is an oil on panel painting by Peter Paul Rubens, now in the Royal Museum of Fine Arts of Belgium, which bought it at Christie's in London on 13 May 1899 at the sale of the collection of Sir Cecil Miles, 3rd Baronet.

Sources

Jesus in art
17th-century paintings
Paintings by Peter Paul Rubens
Collections of the Royal Museums of Fine Arts of Belgium